Lounès Hamraoui is a French boxer. He competed at the 2022 European Amateur Boxing Championships, winning the bronze medal in the super heavyweight event.

References

External links 

Living people
Place of birth missing (living people)
Year of birth missing (living people)
French male boxers
Light-welterweight boxers